Astathes cincta is a species of beetle in the family Cerambycidae. It was described by Gahan in 1901. It is known from Java.

References

C
Beetles described in 1901